São Marçal (Portuguese for Saint Martial) is a suburb of the city São Tomé in the nation of São Tomé and Príncipe. Its population is 2,866 (2012 census). It is 2.3 km southeast of the city centre of São Tomé and 1 km northwest of Pantufo.

Population history

References

Populated places in Água Grande District
Populated coastal places in São Tomé and Príncipe